Lokomotief Rijswijk, also known as simply Lokomotief, is a Dutch amateur basketball club based in Rijswijk. Established on 1 April 1971, both the first men's and women's teams currently play in the Promotiedivisie, the second-tier league in Dutch basketball. The club has won one major trophy in its history, when it won the NBB Cup in the 1986–87 season. In 2018 and 2019, Lokomotief won consecutive Promotiedivisie titles. The team has since then played well in the NBB Cup competition, even eliminating first level club Den Helder Suns in the 2020–21 season.

Honours
Promotiedivisie
Winners (3): 2017–18, 2018–19, 2021–22
NBB Cup
Winners (1): 1986–87

References

External links
Official website (in Dutch)

Basketball teams established in 1971
Basketball teams in the Netherlands